Rick U. Parros (born June 14, 1958) is a former American football running back in the National Football League. He was drafted by the Denver Broncos in the fourth round of the 1980 NFL Draft, for whom he played from 1981 through 1984. He was Denver's leading rusher in 1981 with 749 yards on 176 carries. He played college football at Utah State.

Parros also played for the Seattle Seahawks from 1985 through 1987.

References

1958 births
Living people
American football fullbacks
Denver Broncos players
Seattle Seahawks players
Utah State Aggies football players
Sportspeople from Brooklyn
Players of American football from New York City
African-American players of American football
National Football League replacement players
21st-century African-American people
20th-century African-American sportspeople